The Ontario Bond Scandal was a scandal that hit the government of Ontario in the early 1920s.

Ontario had been governed by the United Farmers of Ontario of Ernest C. Drury since 1919.  In 1922 newspapers revealed that Peter Smith, the Ontario Treasurer, had given a close friend of his, Andrew Pepall, lucrative payments to travel to London to secure better financing for Ontario's debt.  The original outrage was that Pepall had been paid the then large sum of eighty dollars per day for the trip, in which he did little actual work.

The scandal escalated when it was discovered that a portion of the commission for the bond contracts had found their way into Smith's bank account.  Andrew Pepall's firm, owned by Aemilius Jarvis, had earned some 130,000 pounds in profit from the arrangements, and these profits had been divided among Pepall, Smith and Jarvis.  The scandal played an important role in the fall of the U.F.O. government in 1923.

The next year Jarvis and Smith went on trial.  Also charged were Jarvis's son and Andrew Pepall's brother, Harry Pepall. They were both accused of playing a minor role in the affair.  The verdicts were handed out on October 24, 1924.  Jarvis and Smith were found guilty of conspiracy to defraud the government. Jarvis was sentenced to six months in prison, Smith received three years. They were each fined 600,000 dollars, then the largest fines ever demanded in the British Empire.  Jarvis Jr. and Harry Pepall were found not guilty.  Andrew Pepall had fled to California. At that time conspiracy was not an extraditable offence, and he could only be brought back to Canada to face charges of theft and bribery.  He was found not guilty of these in late 1925.

Aemilius Jarvis -the public figure in the affair- was convicted on the charge of conspiracy, after having in fact saved the provincial government millions of dollars in the retirement of war bonds. Though he was jailed for six months, for the remainder of his life he defended his innocence. He'd refused, against all advice, to testify in his own defence at trial, and one theory as to why is that he was shielding/taking a fall for his son, also charged in the case, after having tragically lost another son previously in World War I. Jarvis' business peers signed a petition detailing the reasoned argument for his innocence, which was proven when he took the stand, in the trial of Andrew Pepall. He was ultimately technically cleared, although that absolution was never signed off on by a future Ontario government. The Premier of Ontario (from 1919–23), Ernest C. Drury, labelled Jarvis "Canada's Dreyfus," a reference to Alfred Dreyfus who was wrongfully charged and jailed in his native France at the turn-of-the-century for blatantly political reasons.

See also 
 Aemilius Jarvis

References

Ontario political scandals
Finance fraud